The Quest is a 1996 American martial arts film co-written and directed by Jean-Claude Van Damme in his directorial debut, who also starred in the film. The film co-stars Roger Moore, James Remar and Janet Gunn. The Quest premiered in Turkey on April 19, 1996, and was released in the United States on April 26, 1996.

The plot, set in 1925, revolves around a martial arts tournament in the mysterious "Lost City", located deep in Tibet, with martial artists from around the world fighting to earn the winner's prize, the "Golden Dragon", a valuable statue made of solid gold. Claims by Frank Dux that the film was a reworking of a script he had written in 1991, entitled "Enter the New Dragon: The Kumite," were rejected by a jury.

Plot
Late night in an empty bar in the present day (the mid-1990s), an old man enters and awaits service, and not long after, a group of thugs arrive and attempt to rob the till. The old man defeats them easily one by one with hand-to-hand combat. Amazed, the bartender asks how he learned to fight. The old man replies "it was long ago..."

The story flashes back to Christopher Dubois, a pickpocket in his mid-twenties, living in 1925 New York City. Orphaned as a child, Dubois looks after a large group of young orphans by performing cons and stealing. After stealing a large sum of money from a group of gangsters, Dubois and the children are found by the gangsters. Dubois is able to subdue the gangsters, but the struggle draws the attention of the police. After promising to return to the children, Dubois escapes the police by stowing away on a boat. He is found out by the crew and imprisoned by gun smugglers and pirates and forced into physical labor. Eventually, the crew decides Dubois is no longer needed, but before he can be killed, the pirate ship is attacked and boarded by a mercenary Englishman, Lord Edgar Dobbs. After saving each other's lives, Dobbs agrees to help Dubois return home, but deceives him and sells Dubois into slavery on an island off the coast of Siam, where Dubois is trained in Muay Thai fighting.

After six months, Dobbs and his partner Harry Smythe find Dubois fighting in a Muay Thai match and see that he has become a skilled fighter. Dobbs later assists (and exploits) Dubois, buying his freedom so the now-expert fighter can represent the U.S in a Kumite-like tournament called the Ghang-gheng, held in the Lost City of Tibet. There representatives of Germany, Soviet Union, Scotland, Spain, Turkey, Brazil, Korea, Siam, Greece, France, China, Japan, Okinawa, Africa, and Mongolia fight in elimination bouts. The winner of the tournament receives a valuable statue made of solid gold, the Golden Dragon. Along for the journey are American reporter Carrie Newton and heavyweight boxing champion Maxie Devine.

Dubois ultimately wins the tournament by defeating Khan, the representative of Mongolia, and he is given a medal and proclaimed the greatest fighter, but does not accept the Golden Dragon. Instead he trades it for the lives of Dobbs and his comrade Harry, who were sentenced to death for previously trying to steal the Golden Dragon.

Back in the bar, Dubois explains he returned to New York and helped the children get off the streets. Ultimately, things turned out for the best. Devine helped to train many great fighters, while Dobbs and Harry opened a trading post deep in the Amazon. In the final scene, a book closes, revealing its title, 'The Quest', and that it was written by Carrie Newton.

The Ghang-gheng
Winners in bold.

First-round matches
Soviet Union vs Spain
Japan vs Okinawa
France vs Brazil
China vs Korea
Turkey vs Scotland
Siam vs Africa
Germany vs United States
Mongolia vs Greece

Second-round matches
Japan vs Turkey
Brazil vs China
Mongolia vs Siam
Spain vs United States

Semi-final matches
United States vs China
Mongolia vs Japan

Final match
United States vs Mongolia

Cast

Production
The re-written script was revealed in 1993 by Quintano.

Reception

Box office
The Quest opened at #1 and earned $7 million in its first weekend in the US. It fell to third in the week of May 6. It ultimately grossed $21.6 million at the American box office and $35.8 million internationally, for a grand total of $57.4 million.

Critical response
The reaction of many professional film critics was negative, citing the movie's thin script, Jean-Claude Van Damme's direction, and too much resemblance to Van Damme's previous hit Bloodsport. However, some critics praised the film's production values, beautiful locations, and Roger Moore's performance, while fans of martial arts films praised The Quest for showcasing various fighting styles from around the world. On review aggregator website Rotten Tomatoes, the film received an approval rating of 14% based on 21 reviews and an average rating of 3.7/10.

Audiences polled by CinemaScore gave the film an average grade of "B" on an A+ to F scale.

References

External links
 
 
 

1996 films
1996 directorial debut films
1996 martial arts films
American martial arts films
1990s English-language films
Films directed by Jean-Claude Van Damme
Films scored by Randy Edelman
Films set in 1925
Films set in the 1920s
Films with screenplays by Jean-Claude Van Damme
Films shot in Thailand
Kickboxing films
Martial arts tournament films
Underground fighting films
Universal Pictures films
1990s American films